Golden Rainbow is a 2013 South Korean television drama series starring Uee, Jung Il-woo, Cha Ye-ryun and Lee Jae-yoon. It aired on MBC from November 2, 2013 to March 30, 2014 on Saturdays and Sundays at 21:55 for 41 episodes.

Plot
Adopted and raised by the same father, seven orphans grew up together as a family in a town near the ocean. With the bond between them even stronger than that of blood-related siblings, they experience hardships together and struggle to succeed in the marine products industry. It mainly revolves around a girl who was kept away from her mother by her father's mother. The mother asks her long time friend to steal her back. So he did. He got caught and went to prison for 6 years. The girl is back with the grandmother but 6 years later at an amusement park, she is kidnapped. She later on escapes and finds home with a boy and his grandmother. The grandmother later on dies and the longtime friend that stole her back the first time finds them trying to steal fish but keeps them as his own kids. He adds on 5 more kids later after them.

Cast

Main characters
Uee as Kim Baek-won / Jang Ha-bin (3rd child)  
Kim Yoo-jung as teenage Baek-won 
Lee Chae-mi as child Baek-won
Jung Il-woo as Seo Do-young 
Oh Jae-moo as teenage Do-young
Cha Ye-ryun as Kang Kyung-mi / Kim Cheon-won / Yoon Ha-bin (2nd child)
Song Yoo-jung as teenage Cheon-won
Lee Jae-yoon as Kim Man-won (eldest child)
Seo Young-joo as teenage Man-won
Jeon Jun-hyeok as child Man-won
Kim Sang-joong as Kim Han-joo
Do Ji-won as Yoon Young-hye
Jo Min-ki as Seo Jin-ki
Ahn Nae-sang as Chun Eok-jo

Supporting characters
Kim Han-joo's family
Choi Soo-im as Kim Shib-won (4th child)
Ahn Seo-hyun as young Shib-won
Lee Ji-hoon as Kim Yeol-won (5th child)
Jung Yoon-seok as young Yeol-won
Kim Tae-joon as Kim Il-won (6th child)
Park Sun-ho as Kim Young-won / Michinski Forever (7th child)
Choi Ro-woon as young Young-won

Seo Jin-ki's family
Park Won-sook as Kang Jung-shim
Ji Soo-won as Jang Mi-rim
Jae Shin as Seo Tae-young
Lee Seung-ho as teenage Tae-young

Chun Eok-jo's family
Kim Hye-eun as Yang Se-ryun
Ryu Dam as Chun Soo-pyo
Gree as teenage Soo-pyo

Extended cast
Lee Won-pal as Park Woong 
Lee Hee-jin as Park Hwa-ran
Lee Dae-yeon as Kim Jae-soo
Seo Hyun-chul as Kang Dong-pal
Kim Dae-ryung as Jo Kang-doo
Ham Sung-min as Jeong-woo	
Choi Dae-sung as Officer Lee
Park Chung-seon as class president
Ji Young-woo as hotelier
Lee Seung-won as homeroom teacher
Park Woo-chun as Jung Jae-hong
Yoo Ara as Young-won's secretary
Lee Seung-ho as Seo Tae-yeong
Kang Hyun-jung as female investigator 
Kim Ki-joon as Oh Kwang-hyuk
Kang Ji-won as Oh Eun-ji
Shim Ho-sung as employee at fish farm 
Kim Kwang-in as chief prosecutor

Awards and nominations

References

External links
 
Golden Rainbow at MBC Global Media

MBC TV television dramas
2013 South Korean television series debuts
2014 South Korean television series endings
Korean-language television shows
South Korean romance television series